Richard Noyes Viets (born November 10, 1930) represented the United States as Ambassador to Tanzania in 1979, Jordan in 1981, and nominated to be Ambassador to Portugal in 1987 but the Senate did not act upon his nomination.

While his nomination was being considered by the Senate Foreign Relations Committee, Senator Jesse Helms and Claiborne Pell locked horns.  Helms had several issues with Viets including “grievances filed against Mr. Viets by three junior diplomats and allegations that he may not have paid taxes owed in the United States.”

References

External links
Nomination of Richard Noyes Viets To Be United States Ambassador to Portugal
Nomination of Richard Noyes Viets To Be United States Ambassador to Jordan
Nomination of Richard Noyes Viets To Be United States Ambassador to Jordan

1930 births
Living people 
Ambassadors of the United States to Tanzania
Ambassadors of the United States to Jordan
United States Foreign Service personnel